Émile V. Schlesser (born 1986) is a Luxembourgish film director, screenwriter, composer and multimedia artist.

Biography 
Émile V. Schlesser was born in Luxembourg City in 1986. He studied painting with Markus Lüpertz at the Kunstakademie Düsseldorf from 2007 to 2009, followed by studies in video and film with Marcel Odenbach. In 2018 he graduated with the title "Meisterschüler" (master student). 

In 2015, he made the short film Roxy, marking the start of his collaboration with producer and director Fabien Colas. Schlesser financed the production by selling his paintings created during his art studies. His next short film Superhero, starring Maria Dragus, Jannik Schümann and Nico Randel, won the 13th Street Shocking Short Award in 2020. This award is presented every year by NBC Universal at the Munich Film Festival. In 2021 he made two more short films, Vis-a-Vis (starring his brother, actor Tommy Schlesser) and the tragicomic satire Kowalsky.

He lives in Luxembourg and Düsseldorf. In addition to his native Luxembourgish, Schlesser is fluent in German, English and French.

Filmography

Awards and nominations 

For Superhero 

 2020: Shocking Short Award by NBC Universal/13th Street
 2020: „Prädikat: Wertvoll“ by Deutsche Film- und Medienbewertung (FBW)

For Vis-a-Vis

 2021: Lëtzebuerger Filmpräis (nominated)

References

External links 
 Interview The New Current (on Superhero)
 Interview The New Current (on Kowalsky)
 Interview Arte TV (german, french)
 Interview WDR (german)
 Émile V. Schlesser MUBI
 
 Superhero, Directors Notes
 Vis-a-Vis, Booooooom TV
 Vis-a-Vis, Omeleto

Living people
1986 births
Luxembourgian film directors
German-language film directors
Luxembourgian screenwriters
Male screenwriters
Kunstakademie Düsseldorf alumni
Luxembourgian artists
People from Luxembourg City